Johannes Wilhelmus Maria "John" Kerstens (born 20 January 1965) is a Dutch politician and former trade union leader. As a member of the Labour Party (Partij van de Arbeid) he was an MP between 20 September 2012 and 23 March 2017.

Kerstens was vice president of the Federation Dutch Labour Movement (Federatie Nederlandse Vakbeweging) and president of affiliate union FNV Construction (FNV Bouw).

Kerstens studied law at Tilburg University. He is married, has one daughter and a younger son and he lives in Arnhem.

References

External links 
 
  John Kerstens at the website of the Labour Party

1965 births
21st-century Dutch politicians
Dutch trade union leaders
Labour Party (Netherlands) politicians
Living people
Members of the House of Representatives (Netherlands)
People from Arnhem
People from Rucphen
Tilburg University alumni